The Arctic Arts Festival is a festival based in Harstad, Norway.

It was first held in 1965, and consists of music, theatre and art performances.  The festival lasts one week and is held in June.

The Arctic Arts Festival is active throughout the year and has arranged annual festivals in Harstad since 1965. From 1995 to 2015 the festival was acknowledged as a festival of national importance, called "knutepunktfestival", and received funding through the government budget. The Arctic Arts Festival is made possible through various sources of funding from the Norwegian state, Finnmark, Troms and Nordland regional councils, as well as the local Harstad council.

In February 2016 the festival launched a new arts and culture magazine called HØTT.

The Arctic Arts Festival has great faith in arts from the north! The festival is an Arctic event with ambitions of becoming the world's most important arts festival for the entire Arctic region. Together with strong profiles of local arts and culture, the festival sets in motion fresh creative projects. The festival encourage collaborations which bring together different northern regions, and wish to take a leading role as a facilitator of network building and as an arena for Arctic arts and culture. The Arctic Arts Festival will foreground new constellations, partnerships and groundbreaking independent productions.

The Arctic Arts Festival administers arts funding which amounts to awards of in total, 1,3 million kroner annually. The aim is to stimulate local arts and culture, and to fund diverse projects in the fields of theatre, music and visual arts. Through our Young Artists Stipend and Open Call funding we allocate support for creative theatrical projects which challenge the boundaries of artistic expression through new collaborations. We want to provide the opportunity for artists to think big, push the boundaries and take chances!

The Arctic Arts Festival arranges annually NUK (The Northern Norwegian Youth Festival) during the festival week.

Arctic Arts Summit 
In June 2017, under the direction of Maria Utsi, the festival launched Arctic Arts Summit; a Pan-Arctic cultural conference for "policymakers and stakeholders from the cultural sector throughout the Arctic region". The Arctic Arts Summit is a biannual event, rotating between Arctic states and territories. After the first edition in Harstad in 2017, the second edition was helt in June 2019 in Rovaniemi, Finland, hosted by University of Lapland. The edition in 2021 was postponed due to the Covid pandemic, and is taking place in Whitehorse, Yukon, Canada in June 2022. The Canadian edition is co-hosted by The Government of Yukon and the Canada Council for the Arts.

References

Music festivals in Norway
Harstad
Recurring events established in 1965
Festivals established in 1965
Music festivals established in 1965